Streptomyces actinomycinicus is a bacterium species from the genus Streptomyces which has been isolated from soil from a peat swamp forest in the Rayong Province in Thailand.

See also 
 List of Streptomyces species

References

Further reading 
 

actinomycinicus
Bacteria described in 2016